Iva Radoš (born 7 November 1995) is a Croatian taekwondo practitioner.

She won a bronze medal in middleweight at the 2015 World Taekwondo Championships, after being defeated by Zheng Shuyin in the semifinal. Her achievements at the European Taekwondo Championships include gold medals in 2014 and 2016, and a bronze medal in 2018.

References

External links

1995 births
Living people
Croatian female taekwondo practitioners
Taekwondo practitioners at the 2015 European Games
European Games medalists in taekwondo
European Games bronze medalists for Croatia
European Taekwondo Championships medalists
World Taekwondo Championships medalists
Medalists at the 2015 Summer Universiade
Universiade silver medalists for Croatia
21st-century Croatian women